Maatouk is an Arabic surname. It derives from the Arabic word for "emancipation", and means "free from slavery", or "freedman".

Maatouk or Maatouq may also refer to:
 Ali Maatouk (born 1988), Libyan footballer
 Amer Maatouq Al Fadhel (born 1988), Kuwaiti footballer
 Ghassan Maatouk (born 1977), Syrian football player and coach
 Hassan Maatouk (born 1987), Lebanese footballer
 Jean Matouk (1937–2020), French economist
 Khalil Maatouk, Syrian lawyer
 Maya Matouk (born 1998), Trinidadian footballer
 Mikie Mahtook (born 1989), American baseball player
 Muhammed Abu Maatouk (born 1950), Syrian playwright
 Toufic Maatouk, Lebanese orchestra conductor

References

Arabic-language surnames